Julius Wulff (1852-1924) was a Danish conservative politician and journalist.  His formal studies were in Zoology and he worked as a teacher in Hjørring from 1879 to 1887. During this period he developed his interest in politics becoming the editor of a Conservative journal. He served for two periods as a Danish conservative member of parliament (1895–98 and 1909–18) and he was interested in business policy and customs issues. He was a prominent proponent of protection of domestic industry and an opponent of the sale of the Danish West Indies to the United States.

Selected publications
 Wulff, Julius. “Have en Nations Forbrugere og Producenter modsatte Interesser?” (Do a Nation's Consumers and Producers Represent Opposite Interests?). Tidsskrift for Industri og Haandvark, 1896.
 Wulff, Julius.  “Have Forbrugere og Producenter modsatte Interesser?” (Do Consumers and Producers Represent Opposite Interests?), Nationalakonomisk Tidsskrift, 1896.
 Wulff, Julius.  “Indenlandsk Produktions nationalgkonomiske Betydning” (The Benefit of Domestic Production to a Nation). Tidsskrift for Industri og Haandvark, 191 1.
 Wulff, Julius. Hvorledes Guld kan yngle (How Gold May Multiply). Landsforeningen Dansk Arbejde, 1924.

References

1852 births
1924 deaths
Danish politicians